Sóo is a village in the municipality of Teguise on the island of Lanzarote in the Canary Islands.

References

Populated places in Lanzarote